is a train station located in Ogōri, Fukuoka.

Lines 
Nishi-Nippon Railroad
Tenjin Ōmuta Line

Platforms

Adjacent stations

Surrounding area
 Hirata Dental Clinic
 Restaurant
 Ōnakatomi Shrine

Railway stations in Fukuoka Prefecture
Railway stations in Japan opened in 1924